Peter Nickolas Thodos (November 11, 1927 – December 25, 2011) was a Canadian football player who played for the Calgary Stampeders, Montreal Alouettes, BC Lions, Winnipeg Blue Bombers and Saskatchewan Roughriders. He won the Grey Cup with the Stampeders in 1948. Thodos was born and raised in Vancouver, British Columbia where he also played junior football. He is best known for having scored the winning touchdown of the Grey Cup game, completing the 12–7 victory over the Ottawa Rough Riders for the championship.  Thodos died of heart disease in 2011; at the time of his death he was one of the last living members of the 1948 Stampeders Grey Cup team.

References

External links

1927 births
2011 deaths
Canadian football people from Vancouver
Players of Canadian football from British Columbia
BC Lions players
Calgary Stampeders players
Montreal Alouettes players
Winnipeg Blue Bombers players
Saskatchewan Roughriders players